"It's Been So Long" is a 1953 single written by Autry Grisham and performed by Webb Pierce. The single was Pierce's fourth number one on the country charts, staying at number one for six weeks and spending a total of twenty-two weeks on the chart. The B-side of "It's Been So Long", a song entitled, "Don't Throw Your Life Away" peaked at number nine on the Country Juke Box chart.

References

1953 singles
Webb Pierce songs
Songs written by Webb Pierce